The Wild Atlantic Way is a tourism trail on the west coast, and on parts of the north and south coasts, of Ireland. The 2,500 km (1,553 mile) driving route passes through nine counties and three provinces, stretching from County Donegal's Inishowen Peninsula in Ulster to Kinsale, County Cork, in Munster, on the Celtic Sea coast.

Description

The route is broken down into five sections: 

 County Donegal
 County Donegal to County Mayo
 County Mayo to County Clare
 County Clare to County Kerry
 County Kerry to County Cork
 
Along the route, there are 157 discovery points, 1,000 attractions and more than 2,500 activities. 

The route was officially launched in 2014 by the Minister of State for Tourism and Sport, Michael Ring, T.D.

Key points of interest

North West - Donegal, Leitrim and Sligo 

 Malin Head, Ireland’s most northerly point
 Lough Foyle
 Lough Swilly
 Isle of Doagh
 Carrickabraghy Castle
 Shrove
 Fort Dunree
 Buncrana
 Grianán of Aileach (Greenan Fort)
 Ramelton
 Rathmullan
 Fanad
 Rosguill
 Doe Castle
 Derryveagh Mountains
 Horn Head
 Tory Island
 Árainn Mhór (Arranmore Island)
 Gaoth Dobhair
 The Rosses
 Errigal
 Malin Beg beach
 Slieve League cliffs
 Largy Waterfall (also known as 'South Donegal's Secret Waterfall')
 Blue Stack Mountains
 Donegal Town
 Bundoran – popular with surfers 
 Tullaghan
 Mullaghmore Head 
 Spanish Armada shipwrecks at Streedagh Beach
 Rosses Point Peninsula
 Aughris
 Easky
 Enniscrone

West - Mayo and Galway 

 The Céide Fields
 The Mullet Peninsula
 Achill Island
 Clew Bay
 Croagh Patrick
 Clare Island 
 Inishturk – accessible by ferry from Louisburgh, County Mayo
 Doolough
 Killary Harbour
 Connemara
 Clifden
 Inishbofin – accessible by ferry from Cleggan, County Galway
 Oileáin Árann (Aran Islands) – accessible by ferry from Inverin County Galway and Doolin County Clare.

Mid West - Clare and Limerick 

 The Burren
 The Cliffs of Moher and the Doolin Cliff Walk
 Loop Head
 The Shannon Estuary and the Shannon dolphins

South West - Kerry and Cork 

 Allihies and the Allihies Copper Mine Museum on the Beara Peninsula
 Bere Island
 Cape Clear
 Caherdaniel
 Derrynane beach
 Garnish Island in Glengarriff
 The ruined cottages of Great Blasket Island, and the Blasket Centre in Dunquin
 Dingle, Ireland’s largest Gaeltacht town
 Rossbeigh beach

 The Skellig Experience Visitor Centre
 Dursey Island - Accessible by Ireland’s only cable car
 Heir Island
 Long Island
 Sheep's Head – the Sheep's Head peninsula is home to the Sheep's Head Way walking and cycling routes. 
 Mizen Head – Ireland's southernmost point, with views of Fastnet Rock and Lighthouse
 Kinsale
 Whiddy Island and Whiddy Island view on R572 road

See also
 Antrim Coast Road
 Atlantic Corridor
 EuroVelo 1 Atlantic Coast Cycle Route
 Ireland's Ancient East
 Western Rail Corridor

References

External links 

  from Discover Ireland
 Wild Atlantic Way on the Tourism Ireland website.
 

Long-distance trails in the Republic of Ireland
Ireland
Tourist attractions in the Republic of Ireland
Tourism regions of the island of Ireland